The ACW Tag Team Championship was the top professional wrestling tag team championship title in the American independent promotion Assault Championship Wrestling. The first champions were Heavy Artillery (Apollo and Gunner) who defeated Mind and Matter in the finals of a championship tournament held in Meriden, Connecticut on November 30, 2001. The championship was regularly defended throughout the state of Connecticut, most often in Meriden, Connecticut, until the promotion closed in early-2004.

Kappa Tappa Kegga (Curt Daniels and Andy Jaxx) holds the record for most reigns as a 2-time champion. The team's second reign, lasting 287 days, is the longest in the title's history; their first reign, which lasted only 35 days, was the shortest in the history of the title. There have been a total of 14 recognized individual champions and 7 recognized teams, who have had a combined 8 official reigns, with two vacancies.

Title history
Key

Reigns

References

External links
Official ACW Tag Team Championship Title History
ACW Tag Team Championship at Genickbruch.com

Tag team wrestling championships